The 1977 Virginia Slims of Dallas  was a women's tennis tournament played on indoor carpet courts at the Moody Coliseum in Dallas, Texas that was part of the 1977 Virginia Slims World Championship Series. It was the fifth edition of the tournament, held from March 7 through March 13, 1977. Second-seeded Sue Barker won the singles title and earned $20,000 first-prize money.

Finals

Singles
 Sue Barker defeated  Terry Holladay 6–1, 7–6(5–4)

Doubles
 Martina Navratilova /  Betty Stöve defeated  Kerry Reid /  Greer Stevens 6–2, 6–4

Prize money

References

External links
 ITF tournament edition details

Virginia Slims of Dallas
Virginia Slims of Dallas
Virginia Slims of Dallas
Dallas
Dallas
Virginia Slims of Dallas